The Tetrapodomorpha (also known as Choanata) are a clade of vertebrates consisting of tetrapods (four-limbed vertebrates) and their closest sarcopterygian relatives that are more closely related to living tetrapods than to living lungfish. Advanced forms transitional between fish and the early labyrinthodonts, such as Tiktaalik, have been referred to as "fishapods" by their discoverers, being half-fish, half-tetrapods, in appearance and limb morphology. The Tetrapodomorpha contains the crown group tetrapods (the last common ancestor of living tetrapods and all of its descendants) and several groups of early stem tetrapods, which includes several groups of related lobe-finned fishes, collectively known as the osteolepiforms. The Tetrapodamorpha minus the crown group Tetrapoda are the Stem Tetrapoda, a paraphyletic unit encompassing the fish to tetrapod transition.

Among the characteristics defining tetrapodomorphs are modifications to the fins, notably a humerus with convex head articulating with the glenoid fossa (the socket of the shoulder joint). Another key trait is the internal nostril or choana. Most fish have two pairs of nostrils, one on either side of the head for incoming water (incurrent nostrils) and another pair for outgoing water (excurrent nostrils). Early tetrapodomorphs such as Kenichthys had excurrent nostrils that had migrated to the edge of the mouth. In later tetrapodomorphs, including tetrapods, the excurrent nostril is positioned inside the mouth, where it is known as the choana.

Tetrapodomorph fossils are known from the early Devonian onwards, and include Osteolepis, Panderichthys, Kenichthys and Tungsenia.

Classification

Taxonomy

After Benton, 2004; and Swartz, 2012.

 Subclass Sarcopterygii
 Infraclass Tetrapodomorpha
 Order †Rhizodontida
 Family †Sauripteridae
 Family †Rhizodontidae
 Superorder †Osteolepidida (or Osteolepiformes)
 Family †Canowindridae
 Family †Thysanolepidae
 Family †Tristichopteridae
 Order †Osteolepiformes (or Megalichthyiformes)
 Family †Osteolepidae
 Family †Megalichthyidae
 Clade Eotetrapodiformes
 Clade Elpistostegalia (or Panderichthyida)
 Clade Stegocephalia
 Family †Elpistostegidae
 Family †Whatcheeriidae
 Family †Colosteidae
 Superfamily †Baphetoidea
 Superclass Tetrapoda

Other clades include the Eotetrapodiformes (Tinirau, Platycephalichthys, the Tristichopteridae and Elpistostegalia). Older taxa which include late stem tetrapods and early tetrapods are the Labyrinthodontia and Ichthyostegalia.

Relationships

The cladogram is based on a phylogenetic analysis of 46 taxa using 204 characters by B. Swartz in 2012.

References 

 
 
 

 
Extant Early Devonian first appearances
tl:Tetrapodomorpha